The following is a list of broadcasters of the National Football League Draft.

2020s

2010s

2000s

1990s

1980s

References

External links
ESPN, technology have increased draft's profile
25 years later, airing NFL draft not so zany
From humble beginnings, draft truly has grown into prime-time event
Anchor Ley Discusses ESPN's Inaugural Draft Coverage
USONLINETV, Watch NFL & Draft Live Streaming Here

Broadcasters
Draft broadcasters
NFL Draft Broadcasters
NFL Draft Broadcasters
NFL Draft Broadcasters
NFL Draft Broadcasters
NFL Draft Broadcasters